A History of the Arab Peoples is a book written by the British-born Lebanese historian Albert Hourani.

The book presents the history of the Arabs from the advent of Islam (although some pre-Islamic history is included) to the late 20th Century. More recent editions contain an afterword by Malise Ruthven bringing the history up to the present day including the Invasion of Iraq.

See also
 History of the Arabs by Philip K. Hitti
 The Arabs in History by Bernard Lewis

External links

References

1991 non-fiction books
History books about the Middle East
20th-century history books
History books about ethnic groups
Arab history
Faber and Faber books